Eijiro Takeda (武田 英二郎, born July 11, 1988) is a Japanese football player for Shonan Bellmare.

Club statistics
Updated to 1 March 2019.

1Includes J2's Relegation Playoffs.

References

External links
Profile at Yokohama FC
Profile at Shonan Bellmare 

1988 births
Living people
Aoyama Gakuin University alumni
Association football people from Kanagawa Prefecture
Japanese footballers
J1 League players
J2 League players
Shonan Bellmare players
Yokohama F. Marinos players
JEF United Chiba players
Gainare Tottori players
Avispa Fukuoka players
Yokohama FC players
Association football midfielders